The 2018 All-Ireland Senior Camogie Championship Final, the 87th event of its kind and the culmination of the 2018 All-Ireland Senior Camogie Championship, was played at Croke Park in Dublin on 9 September 2018.

It was the third Cork–Kilkenny final in a row, and was won by Cork by one point.

Details

References

1
All-Ireland Senior Camogie Championship Finals
Cork county camogie team matches
Kilkenny county camogie team matches
All-Ireland Senior Camogie Championship Final
All-Ireland Senior Camogie Championship Final, 2018